The Norman W. V. Hayes Medal was awarded by the Institution of Radio and Electronics Engineers (IREE), Australia,  awarded 
annually for  the most meritorious paper published in the Proceedings of the Institution of Radio and Electronics Engineers Australia during the  preceding year. Adjudication alternated between the Institution of Electrical and Electronic Engineers (New  York) and the Institution of  Electrical Engineers (London). It was named in honour of Norman William Victor Hayes (1891-1950) who was originally communications engineer at the Postmaster-General's Department, Australia, and then later president of the Institution of Radio and  Electronics Engineers until his death. The inaugural medal was in 1951.

Recipients
 1951 Donald Gordon Lindsay, AWA Ltd
 1960 Albert Jakob Seyler,  University of Melbourne
 1964 Albert Jakob Seyler,  University of Melbourne
 1968 Albert Neville Thiele, Australian Broadcasting Corporation
 1968 Thomas Albert Pascoe, Philips Electrical Pty. Ltd.
 1970 Albert Neville Thiele, Australian Broadcasting Corporation
 1971 Alan M. Fowler, Telecom Research Laboratories
 1972 Harro Brueggemann, Graeme Kidd, Lawerence K. (Laurie) Mackechnie, and Albert Jakob Seyler, Australian Post Office Research Laboratories
 1978 Edward M. Cherry,  Monash University
 1980 Robert Henry (Bob) Frater,  CSIRO
 1980 David James Skellern, Macquarie University
 1981 Harry E. Green, University of New South Wales
 1982 Peter J. Hall, University of Tasmania, Phillip Alexander (Pip) Hamilton, Deakin University, and Peter M. McCulloch
 1989 Bruce R. Davis, University of Adelaide
 1992 Albert Neville Thiele, University of New South Wales

See also
 List of engineering awards
 List of prizes named after people

References

Australian science and technology awards
Engineering awards
Awards established in 1951